Madonna of the Basket may refer to:

 Madonna of the Basket (Correggio), 1525
 Madonna of the Basket (Rubens), 1615